Oxygen weed is a common name for several plants and may refer to:

Egeria densa, a species of aquatic plant native to South America
Lagarosiphon major, a species of aquatic plant native to Southern Africa